, whose real name is , is a Japanese actress, model and tarento from Fukushima Prefecture.

Career
Yūki's acting career began in 2012 when she won the 37th Horipro talent scout caravan. She was chosen from 29,521 applicants. On November 14, 2012, she debuted with her first song "Kagami no Naka no Watashi: I am a Princess". In April 2013, she made her acting debut in the NTV's drama Kumo no Kaidan. In September of the same year, she played the lead role for the first time in the film Sora Tobu Kingyo to Sekai no Himitsu. Yūki appeared as Kaoruko Onodera with Rena Nōnen in the NHK Asadora Amachan in June 2013. On February 24, 2015, it was announced that she would take a rest for a while because of illness. After 5 months off, she made a comeback, appearing in the live-action version of Death Note premiered on NTV on July 5, 2015. in 2023, she was cast in Japanese version of Dcotor Foster

Filmography

TV dramas
 Kumo no Kaidan (NTV, 2013), Sakiko Tasaka
 Amachan (NHK, 2013), Kaoruko Onodera
 Hakuba no Ōji-sama (YTV, 2013), Kotomi Ichikawa
 Ashita, Mama ga Inai Episode 3 (NTV, 2014), Azusa Yoshida
 Massan (NHK, 2015), Ema Kameyama
 Death Note (NTV, 2015), Near/Mello
 Erased (Netflix/Kansa TV, 2017), Airi Katagiri
 Dakara Watashiwa Oshimashita (So I Pushed) (NHK, 2019), Kyoko Matsuda

Films
 Sora Tobu Kingyo to Sekai no Himitsu (2013), Midori Kuroda
 Otome no Recipe (2014), Akane Amano
 Torihada: Gekijōban 2 (2014)
 As the Gods Will (2014), Shōko Takase
 Fantastic Girls (2015), Ayuko Sasaoka
 Assassination Classroom (2015), Yukiko Kanzaki
 Yakuza Apocalypse (2015)
 Assassination Classroom: Graduation (2016), Yukiko Kanzaki
 Chihayafuru Part 3 (2018), Sumire Hanano
 Marmalade Boy (2018), Meiko Akizuki
 Dad, Chibi is Gone (2019)
 According To Our Butler (2019), Miyu Yukikura
 Gozen (2019), Yae Kamiya
 Walking Man (2019), Uran
 Kiss Him, Not Me (2020), Kotoha
 One in a Hundred Thousand (2020)
 No Call No Life (2021)

Radio
 Mio Yūki's First Diary (Tokyo FM, 2013-)

Commercials
 Kyocera - Kyocera Thinking Energy (2012-)
 Ezaki Glico - Giant Cone (2013-)

Bibliography

Magazines
 Pichi Lemon, Gakken Publishing 1986-, as an exclusive model

Photobooks
 Before (Horipro, 26 November 2012) 
 After (Horipro, 23 March 2013)

References

External links 
  

Living people
1999 births
Actors from Fukushima Prefecture
Japanese film actresses
Japanese television actresses
Japanese television personalities
Japanese female models
Models from Fukushima Prefecture
21st-century Japanese actresses